Senator Early may refer to:

Edward Early (born 1935), Pennsylvania State Senate
John Early (politician) (1828–1877), Illinois State Senate
Nathaniel B. Early (1866–1947), Virginia State Senate
Peter Early (1773–1817), Georgia State Senate

See also
William F. Earley (born 1943), South Dakota State Senate